Colin West (born 1951) is an English children's book author and illustrator. Since 1975, he has written and illustrated over 50 children's books.
He studied at the Royal College of Art under Quentin Blake.

Select bibliography
"Monty, the Dog who Wears Glasses", 1989 A&C Black 
The Adventures of Monty the Dog who Wears Glasses (Monty the Dog who Wears Glasses, Monty Bites Back and Monty Must be Magic in one book) Black, 1995 
Moose and Mouse (I Am Reading series) Macmillan/Kingfisher, 2004 
Hello, Great Big Bullfrog Walker, 2009 
Have You Seen the Crocodile? Walker, 2009 
"The Big Book of Nonsense" Hutchinson, 2001

References

External links
Author website

1951 births
Living people
British children's writers